George Peter Nikolakakos (born November 24, 1979) is an American politician who is currently serving as a member of the Montana House of Representatives from District 26. He is a member of the Republican Party.

Biography 
Nikolakakos was born on November 24, 1979, in Albrightsville, Pennsylvania, to Peter and Debra Jean Nikolakakos, the oldest of two children. He married Melissa Lynn Durden on November 22, 2003, in Reno, Nevada. They live with their four children in Great Falls, Montana.

Military service 
Shortly after the September 11 attacks, Nikolakakos enlisted into the United States Air Force, serving 20 years from 2001 to 2021 before leaving with the rank of Senior Master Sergeant. During his time in the Air Force, Nikolakakos served in the War in Afghanistan, the Iraq War, and the Syrian Civil War. He also spent some of his time in the military with the Montana Air National Guard, where he was Superintendent of Intelligence for the 120th Air Wing and a Nuclear Accountability Officer at Malmstrom Air Force Base. Nikolakakos claims to have maintained fluency in five different languages due to his time in the Air Force.

References 

Living people
1979 births
Republican Party members of the Montana House of Representatives
Politicians from the Bronx